Dinematichthyini is a tribe of viviparous brotulas, which is conventionally placed within the subfamily Brosmophycinae. They are differentiated from the other tribe  within that subfamily, the Brosmophycinae , by having a single pair of ossified genital claspers, having an absence or greatly reduced scales on the head and having the posterior end of the maxillary bone showing a small amount of vertical expansion. A review of the viviparous brotulas carried out in 2016 elevated the tribe to a family, the Dinematichthyidae.

Genera
The following genera are included in the tribe Dinematichthyini:

 Alionematichthys
 Beaglichthys
 Brosmolus
 Brotulinella
 Dactylosurculus
 Dermatopsis
 Dermatopsoides
 Diancistrus
 Didymothallus
 Dinematichthys
 Dipulus
 Gunterichthys
 Lapitaichthys
 Majungaichthys
 Mascarenichthys
 Monothrix
 Nielsenichthys
 Ogilbia
 Ogilbichthys
 Paradiancistrus
 Porocephalichthys
 Typhliasina
 Ungusurculus
 Zephyrichthys

References

Bythitidae
Viviparous fish
Fish tribes